Natalya Alekseyevna Zakharova (born 1945) is a retired Russian coxswain. She who two European titles, in the coxed fours in 1966 and in the quadruple sculls in 1967. Zakharova graduated from the Russian State University of Physical Education, Sport, Youth and Tourism, and after retiring from competitions worked as an instructor of physical education.

References

1945 births
Living people
Russian female rowers
Soviet female rowers
Coxswains (rowing)
European Rowing Championships medalists